Suleiman Moini was an Iranian/Kurdish political activist. After the collapse of the 1946 republic, the political activities of the Kurds in Iran declined. Some of the 1946 political activists to went to Iraqi Kurdistan and later joined the rebellion of Mustafa Barzani in the 1960s.

Suleiman Moini, in spite of being young was already an experienced freedom fighter. In the 1960s, he had been the most respected member in the KDPI collective leadership. For eighteen months, during 1967 and 1968, the KDPI led an armed combat against the Shah's heavily armed troops. In the end, the majority of its members were massacred. The party was decapitated.

Suleiman's remains, riddled with bullets, were attached to a ladder with a notice around his neck that said: "Suleiman Moini - this is how traitors die". The regime's hired ruffians carried the ladder with his body from village to village to dissuade the population from opposing the Shah.

Biography 
Suleiman Moeini was born in January 1933 in Mahabad. His father, Mohammad Amin Moeini, was the Minister of Government of the Republic of Mahabad during the time of Qazi Mohammad. Moeini continued his education in the cities of Mahabad, Tabriz and Tehran. Unfortunately, in May 1968, Suleiman Moeini, one of the prominent revolutionary leaders of Rojehlat in Kurdistan, was assassinated by the Iraqi Kurdistan Democratic Party, led by Mullah Mustafa Barzani, and his body was handed over to SAVAK forces and the Pahlavi government of Iran.

Political activity 
From 1946 to the 1979 Iranian revolution, the only major event was a short period of armed struggle from 1967 to 1968 led by a revolutionary group of KDP cadres; the non tribal leaders of this armed struggle were Sulaiman Moini, Smail Sharifzadeh, and Malla Aware. The KDP revolutionary group wanted to have military activities against the Iranian regime instead of joining the rebellion of Barzani in Iraqi Kurdistan. The armed clashes lasted for a few months as they were under attack inside both Iranian and Iraqi Kurdistan. Barzani's forces, because of their military and financial reliance on the Shah's regime in the 1960s, cooperated with the Persian military forces. In 1967 several members of the KDPI, including Ismail Sharifzadeh, Qadir Sharif, and Suleiman Moini, left Ahmad Tawfiq's KDPI. They stressed on military struggles against Tehran.

Death 
Suleyman Moini was executed by M. Mustafa Barzanî on May 15, 1968, and his funeral was given to Iran. He hung out the Iranian funeral for days. Massoud Barzani in his book Barzanî and the Kurdish rebellion, said: "We shot Suleyman Mooni and gave his funeral to Iran".

References 

Iranian activists
Kurdish activists
1933 births
1968 deaths